The Seram swiftlet (Aerodramus ceramensis) is a species of swift in the family Apodidae.
It is found in Buru, Seram, Boano and Ambon Island.  It used to be considered a subspecies of the Moluccan swiftlet.

Its natural habitats are subtropical or tropical moist lowland forests and subtropical or tropical moist montane forests.

References
Rheindt, F.E., and R.O. Hutchinson. 2007. A photoshot odyssey through the confused avian taxonomy of Seram and Buru (southern Moluccas). BirdingASIA 7: 18–38.

Seram swiftlet
Birds of Seram
Seram swiftlet
Seram swiftlet